Zineb Oukach (born January 4, 1993) is a Moroccan film actress and model, known to worldwide audiences for playing the role of Fatima in the 2007  Gavin Hood film Rendition.

Early life
Oukach was born and raised in Casablanca, Morocco. In 2004 she moved to France, where she studied Economics before attending Cours Florent to focus on her acting career.

Career
Already well known in Morocco for her work in Parfum de Mer, by acclaimed Moroccan film maker Abdelhai Laraki, and for her role in the Moroccan television series Une Famille Respectable by Kamal Kamal, in 2007 Oukach rose to international fame for her performance as the young Arab lead in the film Rendition alongside Meryl Streep, Jake Gyllenhaal and Reese Witherspoon. Oukach also played a role in The Wolf of Wall Street. And in the science fiction television series Alien Dawn, aired on Nickelodeon.

Filmography
Rendition - Fatima (2007)
(French title: Détention secrète)
Parfum de Mer - Nadia (2006)
(English title: Scent of the Sea)
The Wolf of Wall Street - hostess on yacht (2013)
’’Alien Dawn’’ - Stella

References

External links
 
 Zineb Oukach Fan Club Page
Website:   http://zineboukach.com/

French film actresses
Moroccan film actresses
People from Casablanca
Living people
1982 births
21st-century Moroccan actresses